The Pennsylvania Wing of the Civil Air Patrol (CAP) is the highest echelon of CAP in the Commonwealth of Pennsylvania. Pennsylvania Wing headquarters is located at Fort Indiantown Gap, an Army National Guard installation  near Harrisburg, PA. Pennsylvania Wing is abbreviated as "PAWG", and is often referred to by its members as "PA Wing". A Pennsylvania keystone is a symbol commonly used in patches and designs of PAWG.

History 

Pennsylvania Wing is one of the original 48 wings in Civil Air Patrol.

In the spring of 1942, the Pennsylvania Wing conducted a 30-day experiment with the intention of convincing the Army Air Forces that they were capable of flying cargo missions for the nation. PA Wing transported Army cargo as far as Georgia, and top Army officials were impressed. After the 30 day trial period, the War Department gave CAP permission to conduct courier and cargo service for the military, often flying mail, light cargo, and important military officials between USAAF bases.

One of the Civil Air Patrol's very first "Aviation Cadet Programs" was established at the Pittsburgh Army Air Field in the Spring of 1943.  Accepting young men as "Aviation Cadets" in a delayed enlistment program for the Army Air Forces, the Pittsburgh Squadron trained these boys (as young as 15) in Aerospace and Military subjects and vetted them for service as Army Air Force Pilots.  Graduating a total of 16 Aviation Cadets for the Army in less than ten months, the Pittsburgh Squadron model was copied by units in Philadelphia, New York City and as far south as Florida.  Today, the current Squadron with direct lineage to that Aviation Cadet Unit is the CAP's second longest, continually operated unit on a Military Installation.

On December 31, 1999, PA Wing units were put on stand-by in case of any problems arising from the Y2K bug.

During the September 11 attacks, Pennsylvania Wing was ordered to a stand-by state. Although not officially tasked with any missions in direct support, PAWG radio communications centers were operational and prepared to offer assistance.

In 2006, PA Wing was activated to fly reconnaissance missions during the 2006 flood. PAWG aircraft flew over major waterways to provide detailed photographs of flood-affected areas and to monitor floodwaters as they moved downstream.

31 Members from Pennsylvania Wing Civil Air Patrol traveled 28 hours to Pascagoula, Mississippi to aid in Hurricane Katrina relief efforts. PAWG Ground Teams went door-to-door ensuring that local residents had adequate food, water, and medical care.

In August and September 2011, all CAP emergency service teams in Pennsylvania Wing and CAP members from Maryland, West Virginia, Ohio, and Indiana Wings were activated to assist communities affected by Hurricane Irene (2011) and Tropical Storm Lee (2011).

During the time between September 1, 2010 to December 1, 2011, the Pennsylvania Wing saved eleven lives, provided emergency response in Pennsylvania during the 2011 flooding and severe winter storms.

In November 2012, CAP Pennsylvania Wing emergency services air crews and ground teams were activated to assist communities in Pennsylvania, New Jersey, New York, and Delaware during flooding and high wind of Hurricane Sandy.

During Late December 2017 and early January 2018, CAP Pennsylvania Wing emergency services ground teams were sent to help dig out Erie Pennsylvania.

In March 2021, as a part of Civil Air Patrol's response in combating the COVID-19 pandemic, members of Pennsylvania Wing provided support at a vaccine point of distribution.

Pennsylvania Wing Commanders 

 Lt. Col. William L. Anderson — December 1, 1941 to August 18, 1945
 Lt. Col. Philip F. Neuweiler — August 18, 1945 to March 26, 1946
 Lt. Col. Carl A. Reber — March 26, 1946 to August 15, 1947
 Col. Philip F. Neuweiler — August 15, 1947 to March 21, 1970
 Col. Angelo A. Milano — March 22, 1970 to November 5, 1977
 Temp. Col. Andrew E. Skiba — November 5, 1977 to June 28, 1978
 Lt. Col. Edward T. Kelly (Int.) — June 28, 1978 to January 1, 1979
 Col. Angelo A. Milano — January 1, 1979 to December 7, 1987
 Col. Raymond F. Schuler — December 7, 1987 to February 16, 1990
 Col. M. Allen Applebaum — February 16, 1990 to November 14, 1990
 Col. Larry Kauffman — November 14, 1990 to November 20, 1993
 Col. Joseph A. Guimond, Jr. — November 20, 1993 to August 19, 1995
 Col. Jean-Pierre J. Habets — August 19, 1995 to August 15, 1999
 Col. Fredric K. Weiss — August 15, 1999 to June 14, 2003
 Col. M. Allen Applebaum — June 14, 2003 to September 29, 2007
 Col. Mark A. Lee — September 29, 2007 to November 12, 2011
 Col. Sandra E. Brandon — November 12, 2011 to May 16, 2015
 Col. Gary Fleming — May 16, 2015 to May 18, 2019
Col. Kevin Berry — May 18, 2019 to Present

Pennsylvania Spaatz Awards 

Michael F. S. Hanford — February 14, 1966
Kenneth B. Hibbert — September 12, 1967
Ramon L. Bennedetto — May 16, 1968
Michael A. Allen — November 22, 1968
Richard B. Smith — January 7, 1969
James I. Heald — May 15, 1969
Paul S. Draper — January 14, 1970
Harry Z. Mertz — January 14, 1970
Gary J. Kirkpatrick — May 14, 1970
Roy K. Salomon — April 11, 1972
Marie E. Stutz — June 28, 1972
Donald P. Flinn — July 24, 1972
Mark L. Sweeney — March 15, 1973
George S. Rose — June 18, 1973
Robert P. Pelligrini — August 2, 1973
Gary P. Standorf — November 7, 1974
Keith D. Kries — March 7, 1975
Konrad J. Trautman — February 14, 1977
Robert Mattes — October 2, 1977
Lawrence L. Trick — November 22, 1977
Jerrold Warthman — March 1, 1978
Richard Magners — July 3, 1978
Richard Graves — August 22, 1978
James Kraftchak — January 2, 1979
William Snee — May 1, 1979
Bryan Watson — November 13, 1979
Robert Atwell — November 16, 1979
Terry Hawes — November 19, 1979
Jeff Riley — August 8, 1980
Terry Friend — September 3, 1980
Tim Hawes — October 27, 1980
Richard Yingling — May 6, 1981
R. Steven Rickert — October 7, 1981
Edward Czeck — June 25, 1982
Sean Neal — December 13, 1982
Anthony Sodano — December 17, 1982
Walter Garnett — April 1, 1984
Kurt Hack — February 28, 1985
Robert Lutz — January 22, 1986
Daniel Weston — May 8, 1986
David Mertes — September 5, 1986
Paul Andrew — April 6, 1988
John Angeny — July 1, 1988
Lawrence L. Stouffer — April 18, 1989
John Talaber — August 8, 1989
Henry Lutz — August 29, 1989
William Davis — June 12, 1990
Kerim Yasar — January 16, 1991
Joseph Shirer — August 27, 1991
Randy Lentz — August 27, 1991
Isaac Zortman — November 21, 1991
Richard Gray — December 9, 1991
Nathaniel Szewczyk — February 25, 1992
Kara Grimaldi — January 18, 1993
Timothy Cheslock — June 29, 1993
Sarah Ferdinand — June 29, 1993
Julian Rivera — January 12, 1995
Julius Armstrong — December 22, 1995
Joel A. Martin — December 3, 1995
Broderick A. Jones — December 3, 1995
Michael T. Bauer — July 19, 1998
Jason Secrest — July 16, 1999
Sean T. Conroy — June 9, 2000
Joshua Plocinski — December 21, 2002
Shawn M. Cressman — March 13, 2003
Erin M. Nelson — February 21, 2006
David J. Spillane — April 21, 2007
Robert A. Nolt — July 26, 2007
Matthew J. Postupack — August 28, 2007
Thomas P. Carr — December 22, 2007
Courtney Gallagher — December 23, 2009
Dane V. Carroll — August 19, 2010
Noah D. Bendele — April 21, 2011
Abigail R. Hawkins — August 9, 2013
Ethan J. Dunlap — May 20, 2014
Nicholas A Cavacini — June 19, 2015
Nicholas G Basile — September 28, 2015
Jared K. Przelomski — January 19, 2016
Adam I. Parker — May 17, 2016
Josiah L. Acosta — August 1, 2017
Matthew J. Chirik — November 6, 2017
Brandon M. Webber — January 21, 2018
Matthew D. Robinson — June 15, 2018
Mallory Fichera — July 26, 2018
Nolan E. Hulick — January 9, 2019
Andrew G. Myers — February 9, 2019
Andrew S. Wieder — August 10, 2019
Colin T. Phipps — January 6, 2021

Source:

Structure 

Pennsylvania Wing is the highest echelon of Civil Air Patrol in Pennsylvania. PA Wing reports to Northeast Region CAP, who reports to CAP National Headquarters.

Pennsylvania Wing Headquarters is located in a renovated former World War Two Post Exchange (PX) and Non Commissioned Officers Club (NCO Club) complex at Fort Indiantown Gap in Annville, Pennsylvania. Offices, classrooms, a communications center and an emergency operations center are located inside the Headquarters. Additionally, the headquarters building is located approximately one mile from Muir Army Airfield.

Reporting to the Wing level, Pennsylvania is divided into six geographic groups. Each group conducts training, activities, classroom learning and programs, with actual missions assigned to a group from the Wing. Originally, the state was divided into three groups (western, central, and eastern); but with an increasing number of squadrons, PAWG divided split each group into northern and southern sections, creating six groups in 2007.

Reporting to each group are 60 squadrons. Squadrons are the local level of organization and serve the local community, and squadrons meet weekly to conduct conducts training, activities, classroom learning and programs to carry out the three missions of Civil Air Patrol - Emergency Services, Cadet Programs, and Aerospace Education.

There are three types of Civil Air Patrol squadrons.
 A cadet squadron focus primarily on providing for cadets (ages 12 to 21).
 A senior squadron is a unit dedicated to allowing senior members to focus on CAP's missions.
 Composite squadrons have both cadets and senior members working together.

As of December 1, 2014, the PA Wing operates 60 squadrons, in six groups, 15 aircraft, 34 ground vehicles and a state-wide radio communications network that is operational 24/7 and is part of a national network.

Groups and Squadrons

Group 1 

Group 1 is responsible for operations in and around the Pittsburgh area.

Group 2 
Group 2 operates around Harrisburg.

Group 3 
Group 3 operates in the greater Philadelphia area.

Group 4 
Group 4 conducts operations in the 14 county area of Eastern Pennsylvania from Lower Bucks County to the PA/NY State Border.

Group 5 
The Group 5 region encompasses much of North Central Pennsylvania, including State College, Altoona, and Williamsport.

Group 6 
Group 6 is responsible for operations near Erie.

See also 
Pennsylvania Air National Guard
Pennsylvania State Guard

References

External links 
Official websites
 Pennsylvania Wing Civil Air Patrol
 Pennsylvania Wing Communications Website

PA Wing cadet activities
 Pennsylvania Wing Cadet Programs
 Pennsylvania Wing Summer Encampment
 Pennsylvania Wing Cadet Leadership School
 Hawk Mountain Ranger School

Wings of the Civil Air Patrol
Education in Pennsylvania
Military units and formations in Pennsylvania